The following are the national records in speed skating in Austria maintained by the Österreichischer Eisschnelllauf Verband.

Men

Women

References

External links
 Austrian Ice Racers web site 
 Austrian records – Men
 Austrian records – Women

National records in speed skating
Speed skating-related lists
Speed skating
Records
Speed skating